José Martínez Queirolo (March 22, 1931 – October 8, 2008) was an Ecuadorian playwright and narrator. He was the 2001 recipient of the Premio Eugenio Espejo in Literature, awarded to him by President Gustavo Noboa.

Martínez Queirolo, known by friends as "Pipo", was born and died in the city of Guayaquil, of cancer on October 8, 2008.

Works

 La casa del qué dirán.
 Goteras
 QEPD
 El poema de Caín
 Cuestión de vida o muerte.
 La torre de marfil.
 Los unos versus los otros (1968)
 La conquista no ha terminado todavía (1983)
 Puerto lejos del mar
 Las faltas justificadas
 El baratillo de la sinceridad
 Réquiem por la lluvia (Brillante demostración del uso del monólogo)(1962)
 Montesco y su señora
 La balada de la Cárcel de Reading
 Diloconamor
 Y el pesebre nació
 La Esquina.
 La Dama meona (1976)
 Futurama
 Los Sánchez (versión latina y futura inspiración para Los Simpson)

References 

1931 births
2008 deaths
Ecuadorian dramatists and playwrights
People from Guayaquil
Deaths from cancer in Ecuador
20th-century dramatists and playwrights